A digital backlot or virtual backlot is a motion-picture set that is neither a genuine location nor a constructed studio; the shooting takes place entirely on a stage with a blank background (often a greenscreen) that will later on project an artificial environment put in during post-production. Digital backlots are mainly used for genres such as science fiction, where building a real set would be too expensive or outright impossible.

Notable films
Among the first films to introduce the technique was Mini Moni the Movie by Shinji Higuchi in 2002, predated by Rest In Peace by Stolpskott Film (2000). Others include:

Released
Rest in Peace (Sweden, 2000) - Shot entirely with green-screen. Some sections fully CGI.
Casshern (Japan,  2004) – Shot on celluloid. A few practical set pieces used.
Able Edwards (United States, 2004) – Shot digitally on Canon XL1 cameras.
Immortal (France, 2004) – Shot on celluloid. Also showed CGI characters interacting with live actors.
Sky Captain and the World of Tomorrow (United States, 2004) – Shot digitally on Sony CineAlta cameras.
Sin City (United States, 2005) – Shot digitally on CineAlta cameras. Three practical sets used.
MirrorMask (United States/United Kingdom, 2005) – Shot on celluloid. 80% of film uses digital backlot. Some practical set pieces used.
The Cabinet of Dr. Caligari (United States, 2005) – Shot digitally.
300 (United States, 2007) – Shot on celluloid. Two practical sets were used.
Speed Racer (United States, 2008) - Directed by the Wachowskis. Three practical sets used.
The Spirit (United States, 2008) – Director Frank Miller shot the film with the same techniques he and Robert Rodriguez used on Sin City.
Avatar (United States, 2009) - Directed by James Cameron. Two practical sets used.
Goemon (Japan, 2009) - The second film from Casshern helmer, Kazuaki Kiriya.
Alice in Wonderland (United States, 2010) - Directed by Tim Burton. Practical sets used.
Sin City: A Dame to Kill For (United States 2014) – Co-directed by Robert Rodriguez and Frank Miller. Sequel to Sin City.

Upcoming
Tribes of October

See also
 Computer-generated imagery
 Digital cinema
 Digital cinematography
 Filmizing
 Live-action/animated film
 virtual studio

References

Film and video technology
Digital media
Film and video terminology